Robert M. Fresco (October 18, 1930 – February 14, 2014) was an American film producer and screenwriter. Along with Denis Sanders he won the Academy Award for Documentary Short Subject for Czechoslovakia 1968.

Selected filmography
 Tarantula (1955)
 The Monolith Monsters (1957)
 The Alligator People (1959)
 Space Invasion of Lapland (1959)
 The Private Navy of Sgt. O'Farrell (1968)
 Czechoslovakia 1968 (1969)

References

External links

1930 births
2014 deaths
Film producers from California
American male screenwriters
People from Culver City, California
Screenwriters from California